The Braille pattern dots-35 is a 6-dot braille cell with the bottom left and middle right dots raised, or an 8-dot braille cell with the lower-middle left and upper-middle right dots raised. It is represented by the Unicode code point U+2814, and in Braille ASCII with the number 9.

Unified Braille

In unified international braille, the braille pattern dots-35 is used to represent unrounded, close or near-close, front to central vowel, such as /i/, /ɪ/, /ɪ̈/, or /ɨ/ when multiple letters correspond to these values, and is otherwise assigned as needed.

Table of unified braille values

Other braille

Plus dots 7 and 8

Related to Braille pattern dots-35 are Braille patterns 357, 358, and 3578, which are used in 8-dot braille systems, such as Gardner-Salinas and Luxembourgish Braille.

Related 8-dot kantenji patterns

In the Japanese kantenji braille, the standard 8-dot Braille patterns 67, 167, 467, and 1467 are the patterns related to Braille pattern dots-35, since the two additional dots of kantenji patterns 035, 357, and 0357 are placed above the base 6-dot cell, instead of below, as in standard 8-dot braille.

Kantenji using braille patterns 67, 167, 467, or 1467

This listing includes kantenji using Braille pattern dots-35 for all 6349 kanji found in JIS C 6226-1978.

  - 貝

Variants and thematic compounds

  -  selector 1 + を/貝  =  斥
  -  を/貝 + selector 5  =  具
  -  数 + を/貝  =  乙
  -  比 + を/貝  =  斤

Compounds of 貝

  -  な/亻 + を/貝  =  債
  -  仁/亻 + を/貝  =  償
  -  ふ/女 + を/貝  =  嬰
  -  れ/口 + ふ/女 + を/貝  =  嚶
  -  へ/⺩ + ふ/女 + を/貝  =  瓔
  -  い/糹/#2 + ふ/女 + を/貝  =  纓
  -  す/発 + を/貝  =  買
  -  つ/土 + を/貝  =  売
  -  に/氵 + つ/土 + を/貝  =  涜
  -  つ/土 + つ/土 + を/貝  =  賣
  -  へ/⺩ + つ/土 + を/貝  =  牘
  -  そ/馬 + つ/土 + を/貝  =  犢
  -  め/目 + つ/土 + を/貝  =  覿
  -  し/巿 + つ/土 + を/貝  =  黷
  -  り/分 + を/貝  =  貧
  -  へ/⺩ + を/貝  =  責
  -  い/糹/#2 + を/貝  =  績
  -  の/禾 + を/貝  =  積
  -  や/疒 + の/禾 + を/貝  =  癪
  -  ぬ/力 + へ/⺩ + を/貝  =  勣
  -  れ/口 + へ/⺩ + を/貝  =  嘖
  -  ま/石 + へ/⺩ + を/貝  =  磧
  -  ち/竹 + へ/⺩ + を/貝  =  簀
  -  み/耳 + へ/⺩ + を/貝  =  蹟
  -  め/目 + を/貝  =  費
  -  ら/月 + を/貝  =  貿
  -  ぬ/力 + を/貝  =  賀
  -  氷/氵 + を/貝  =  資
  -  う/宀/#3 + を/貝  =  賓
  -  ふ/女 + う/宀/#3 + を/貝  =  嬪
  -  て/扌 + う/宀/#3 + を/貝  =  擯
  -  心 + う/宀/#3 + を/貝  =  檳
  -  ほ/方 + う/宀/#3 + を/貝  =  殯
  -  い/糹/#2 + う/宀/#3 + を/貝  =  繽
  -  よ/广 + を/貝  =  贋
  -  か/金 + を/貝  =  鎖
  -  日 + を/貝  =  頃
  -  に/氵 + 日 + を/貝  =  潁
  -  を/貝 + ぬ/力  =  則
  -  よ/广 + を/貝 + ぬ/力  =  厠
  -  を/貝 + れ/口  =  員
  -  龸 + を/貝  =  賞
  -  ほ/方 + を/貝 + れ/口  =  殞
  -  さ/阝 + を/貝 + れ/口  =  隕
  -  を/貝 + 氷/氵  =  敗
  -  を/貝 + と/戸  =  貞
  -  し/巿 + を/貝 + と/戸  =  幀
  -  ま/石 + を/貝 + と/戸  =  碵
  -  ね/示 + を/貝 + と/戸  =  禎
  -  ひ/辶 + を/貝 + と/戸  =  遉
  -  を/貝 + ろ/十  =  財
  -  を/貝 + こ/子  =  貢
  -  き/木 + を/貝 + こ/子  =  槓
  -  火 + を/貝 + こ/子  =  熕
  -  を/貝 + 比  =  貨
  -  を/貝 + 比 + selector 4  =  貲
  -  を/貝 + ん/止  =  販
  -  を/貝 + り/分  =  貪
  -  を/貝 + て/扌  =  貯
  -  を/貝 + よ/广  =  貰
  -  を/貝 + き/木  =  貴
  -  も/門 + を/貝 + き/木  =  匱
  -  き/木 + を/貝 + き/木  =  櫃
  -  め/目 + を/貝 + き/木  =  瞶
  -  ち/竹 + を/貝 + き/木  =  簣
  -  せ/食 + を/貝 + き/木  =  饋
  -  を/貝 + 囗  =  貸
  -  を/貝 + 囗 + ん/止  =  贇
  -  を/貝 + は/辶  =  貼
  -  を/貝 + に/氵  =  賃
  -  を/貝 + ら/月  =  賄
  -  を/貝 + み/耳  =  賊
  -  を/貝 + け/犬  =  賛
  -  て/扌 + を/貝 + け/犬  =  攅
  -  い/糹/#2 + を/貝 + け/犬  =  纉
  -  え/訁 + を/貝 + け/犬  =  讃
  -  を/貝 + を/貝 + け/犬  =  贊
  -  か/金 + を/貝 + け/犬  =  鑚
  -  を/貝 + 数  =  賜
  -  を/貝 + ま/石  =  賠
  -  を/貝 + す/発  =  賢
  -  を/貝 + 日  =  賭
  -  を/貝 + む/車  =  購
  -  を/貝 + う/宀/#3  =  賽
  -  を/貝 + お/頁  =  贄
  -  を/貝 + ほ/方  =  贅
  -  を/貝 + そ/馬  =  贈
  -  れ/口 + を/貝 + そ/馬  =  囎
  -  を/貝 + つ/土  =  贖
  -  ん/止 + を/貝 + を/貝  =  罌
  -  を/貝 + を/貝 + を/貝  =  貭
  -  と/戸 + 宿 + を/貝  =  屓
  -  を/貝 + selector 4 + 囗  =  戝
  -  に/氵 + 宿 + を/貝  =  潰
  -  け/犬 + 宿 + を/貝  =  狽
  -  へ/⺩ + 宿 + を/貝  =  瑣
  -  え/訁 + 宿 + を/貝  =  讚
  -  を/貝 + selector 2 + の/禾  =  貶
  -  を/貝 + selector 4 + な/亻  =  貽
  -  を/貝 + す/発 + れ/口  =  賂
  -  を/貝 + selector 4 + つ/土  =  賍
  -  を/貝 + き/木 + な/亻  =  賚
  -  を/貝 + 宿 + 囗  =  賤
  -  を/貝 + り/分 + け/犬  =  賺
  -  を/貝 + selector 4 + て/扌  =  賻
  -  を/貝 + 宿 + 日  =  贍
  -  ⺼ + 宿 + を/貝  =  贏
  -  を/貝 + ふ/女 + 火  =  贐
  -  を/貝 + 宿 + す/発  =  贓
  -  を/貝 + 宿 + を/貝  =  贔
  -  か/金 + 宿 + を/貝  =  鑽
  -  を/貝 + 龸 + せ/食  =  鵙
  -  を/貝 + 宿 + せ/食  =  鸚
  -  を/貝 + 龸 + さ/阝  =  齎

Compounds of 斥

  -  ゑ/訁 + を/貝  =  訴
  -  て/扌 + selector 1 + を/貝  =  拆
  -  に/氵 + selector 1 + を/貝  =  泝
  -  き/木 + 龸 + を/貝  =  柝

Compounds of 具

  -  な/亻 + を/貝 + selector 5  =  倶
  -  る/忄 + を/貝 + selector 5  =  惧
  -  む/車 + を/貝 + selector 5  =  颶

Compounds of 乙

  -  せ/食 + を/貝  =  乱
  -  ち/竹 + を/貝  =  乳
  -  ろ/十 + を/貝  =  乾
  -  こ/子 + を/貝  =  孔
  -  れ/口 + こ/子 + を/貝  =  吼
  -  き/木 + を/貝  =  札
  -  い/糹/#2 + き/木 + を/貝  =  紮
  -  や/疒 + 数 + を/貝  =  乢
  -  て/扌 + 数 + を/貝  =  扎
  -  せ/食 + せ/食 + を/貝  =  亂
  -  い/糹/#2 + 宿 + を/貝  =  糺
  -  む/車 + 宿 + を/貝  =  軋

Compounds of 斤

  -  も/門 + を/貝  =  匠
  -  て/扌 + を/貝  =  折
  -  れ/口 + を/貝  =  哲
  -  え/訁 + を/貝  =  誓
  -  日 + て/扌 + を/貝  =  晢
  -  に/氵 + て/扌 + を/貝  =  浙
  -  と/戸 + を/貝  =  所
  -  む/車 + を/貝  =  斬
  -  つ/土 + む/車 + を/貝  =  塹
  -  や/疒 + む/車 + を/貝  =  嶄
  -  る/忄 + む/車 + を/貝  =  慙
  -  き/木 + む/車 + を/貝  =  槧
  -  か/金 + む/車 + を/貝  =  鏨
  -  に/氵 + を/貝  =  漸
  -  ま/石 + を/貝  =  新
  -  ん/止 + を/貝  =  欣
  -  て/扌 + ん/止 + を/貝  =  掀
  -  ね/示 + を/貝  =  祈
  -  心 + を/貝  =  芹
  -  ひ/辶 + を/貝  =  近
  -  を/貝 + の/禾  =  断
  -  を/貝 + を/貝 + の/禾  =  斷
  -  を/貝 + を/貝  =  質
  -  み/耳 + を/貝  =  躓
  -  れ/口 + 比 + を/貝  =  听
  -  つ/土 + 比 + を/貝  =  圻
  -  る/忄 + 比 + を/貝  =  忻
  -  に/氵 + 比 + を/貝  =  沂
  -  か/金 + 比 + を/貝  =  釿
  -  れ/口 + 宿 + を/貝  =  嘶
  -  て/扌 + 宿 + を/貝  =  撕
  -  ま/石 + 宿 + を/貝  =  斫
  -  き/木 + 宿 + を/貝  =  斯

Notes

Braille patterns